"The I in Team" is the 13th episode of season 4 of the television show Buffy the Vampire Slayer.

Plot
Willow, Anya, and Xander are playing three-handed poker since Buffy is elsewhere. They question the intentions of the Initiative. In a field test against the commandos, Buffy impresses Professor Walsh. The next day in the cafeteria, Buffy gushes about her performance to Willow. Willow invites Buffy to meet with the Scooby Gang at the Bronze that night. Willow obviously misses Buffy, who has been rather busy of late.

Giles visits Spike at his new crypt to pay the $300 he owes Spike for undoing his demon spell. Spike makes it clear that he will not help them again and wants nothing to do with the Scoobies. Riley takes Buffy into the Initiative, where Walsh gives her a tour of the impressive facility and makes her a member of the team. However, a slip from Buffy indicating her prior knowledge of the Initiative's behavior modification research (viz. Spike's chip) does not go unnoticed. Tara tries to give a crystal to Willow, a family heirloom, but Willow refuses to accept the powerful magical implement. Tara invites Willow to try some spells with the crystal that night. Willow reluctantly declines due to her plans with the Scoobies. Walsh enters Room 314 in the secure lab area to check up on her special project: a part-demon, part-human, part robot creature named Adam.

Buffy is an hour late meeting her friends at the Bronze, and when she does show, she brings Riley and the team. Buffy reveals that she is now working with the Initiative. Willow questions how much trust Buffy should put in the organization. After Buffy rushes off with the team, Willow, feeling abandoned, goes to Tara's dorm room after all. Buffy and the commandos deploy in two teams in search of a Polgara demon. They are instructed to keep the demon's arms, which contain vicious spears, intact.

Forrest spots Spike and sends his team after the vampire. Spike escapes, but they shoot him with a tracer to be able to track him later. The Polgara demon attacks the Alpha team; Buffy and Riley, fighting together, apparently kill it. Stimulated, they have sex for the first time in Riley's dorm room as Walsh watches them from a secret camera. As Buffy and Riley wake up in bed together in the morning, they talk, but when Buffy asks about "314", Riley immediately receives a call from Walsh with an assignment. Walsh and Dr. Angleman decide to go ahead with their plan to get rid of Buffy.

Desperate and unable to shake off the commandos, Spike goes to a reluctant Giles for help, begrudgingly returning most of the money that Giles paid him. Giles tries to remove the tracer from Spike's shoulder, but it is in deep. Riley reinforces Forrest's team. With the soldiers gone, Walsh summons Buffy for a very easy mission and arms her with a stun rifle. Wearing a heart monitor and sound camera, Buffy goes out alone. The mission is a trap. The rifle shorts out, the exit is barred, and Buffy is set upon by two powerful demons armed with axes.

With Willow doing a masking spell to buy time and Spike drinking a beer in lieu of anesthesia, Giles finally manages to remove the tracer from the vampire's shoulder. They flush it down the toilet just in time to misdirect Riley and his team. Buffy kills the demons, but in the fight the monitor falls off. With no reported heartbeat or movement Walsh assumes that she is dead and tells Riley this. In the middle of her "eulogy", Buffy picks up the camera and reveals, in full view of Riley, Walsh's trap, causing him to walk out on Walsh.

Back at Giles' apartment, Giles strongly urges Spike to leave Sunnydale for his own safety, reasoning that it is not safe for him to remain there while the Initiative is still active; Buffy arrives and tells everyone that it is not safe for any of them.

The Initiative has grafted an arm from the Polgara demon to Adam. Walsh, upset that she had to sacrifice Buffy and Riley's loyalty to safeguard her great project Adam, goes to Room 314 and speaks to the sleeping creature. Adam awakes and skewers Walsh with his new arm spear, killing her.

References

External links

 

Buffy the Vampire Slayer (season 4) episodes
2000 American television episodes
Television episodes written by David Fury